Skotfos Avis was a Norwegian newspaper, published in Skotfoss in Telemark county.

Skotfos Avis was started on 1 October 1901, and was somewhat special in its time in that it was an apolitical newspaper, designed to be the local newspaper of  Skotfoss. It was owned from 1921 on by the local company Skotfoss Bruk, which demanded this apolitical attitude.  The best-known editor-in-chief was Emanuel Sørensen, who served from 1901 to 1919. The newspaper went defunct on 8 March 1930, mainly because Skotfoss became more connected to the city Skien, and Skien's larger newspapers became more widely read.

References

1901 establishments in Norway
1930 disestablishments in Norway
Defunct newspapers published in Norway
Newspapers published in Norway
Norwegian-language newspapers
Publications established in 1901
Publications disestablished in 1930
Skien
Mass media in Telemark